Ngambwe is a Bantu language of Angola. Until perhaps Anita Pfouts (2003), it was considered a dialect of Nyaneka.

Notes

Southwest Bantu languages
Languages of Angola